Androstenediol diacetate, or 5-androstenediol 3β,17β-diacetate, also known as androst-5-ene-3β,17β-diol 3β,17β-diacetate, is a synthetic anabolic-androgenic steroid and an androgen ester – specifically, the C3β,17β diacetate diester of 5-androstenediol (androst-5-ene-3β,17β-diol) – which was never marketed. The medication has been used with success to treat breast cancer in women.

See also
 List of androgen esters

References

Abandoned drugs
Acetate esters
Androgen esters
Androgens and anabolic steroids
Androstanes
Hormonal antineoplastic drugs
Prodrugs
World Anti-Doping Agency prohibited substances